Alfonso Jaramillo (born 20 July 1947) is a Colombian footballer. He competed in the men's tournament at the 1968 Summer Olympics.

References

External links
 
 

1947 births
Living people
Colombian footballers
Colombia international footballers
Olympic footballers of Colombia
Footballers at the 1968 Summer Olympics
Footballers from Bogotá
Association football forwards
Independiente Medellín footballers